Donald Foley (1963-2011) was an American actor.

Life and career 
Shortly after the Sept. 11 terrorist attacks, Donald Foley made a decision. “It kind of woke me up a little bit,” he said. Life was too short and too uncertain to waste it doing something he didn’t really want to do, he said. A self-employed computer programmer, Foley was admittedly wasting hours and hours every day playing computer games.

After 9/11, Foley decided that what he really wanted to do was act. So he started acting.  “I was feeling like life was not giving me what I needed,” he said. “I felt like something was missing, so I decided to make a change and try my hand at acting. I never looked back.”

Foley was from Boston and is best known for his role of Bluey Batchelder in the movie The Golden Boys.

Filmography

References

External links

Official Website

1963 births
2011 deaths
American male film actors
American male television actors